Pu H. Lallungmuana is a politician from Mizoram who was a Member of the Mizoram (Lok Sabha constituency) as an Independent candidate in the 12th Lok Sabha, the lower house of the Indian Parliament.

Education
He has completed his Education up to Phd level and has worked as a Principal in Pachhunga University College up to 2008.

Politics
Lallungmuana was elected as an Independent candidate supported by Mizo People's Conference and Zoram Nationalist Party combine in 1998 when he defeated his nearest Congress rival and veteran Congress leader John Lalsangzuala by a margin of 41 votes.

References

1944 births
Living people
People from Serchhip district
India MPs 1998–1999
Lok Sabha members from Mizoram
Mizo people